Trithioarsenite, also called sulfarsenite, is the trianion . It is a pyramidal anion, as is typical of other  compounds.

Thioarsenites are components of many sulfosalt minerals. An example is relatively common mineral proustite, which is silver(I) trithioarsenite.

References

Sulfosalt minerals